Adib Kheir was a leading Syrian nationalist of the 1920s. He was the owner of the Librairie Universelle in Damascus. His granddaughter is the spouse of Manaf Tlass.

References 

Politicians from Damascus
20th-century Syrian people
Syrian nationalists